Michael Federle is an American manager and publisher, since 2017 the chief executive officer of Forbes Media. Under his leadership Forbes used the wide licensing strategy and created about 40 local editions in 70 countries, and Forbes brand extensions in education, financial services, etc. Recently he prepares Forbes for the IPO to enter the New York Stock Exchange.

Education 
He attended Tulane University until 1979 and graduated from Colby College in 1981.

Career 
Main roles have included:
from 1983: sales and marketing management roles on magazine publishing at Time Inc. and Ziff Davis
1999 – Publisher at Fortune magazine
2006 – Group publisher at Time Inc. Business and Finance Network
2008 – Chief executive officer of B2B networks at Next Jump
2009 – Group publisher at Bonnier Corporation
2010 – President and chief operating officer at Techonomy Media
Forbes Media:
2011 – Chief operating officer
2016 – President and chief operating officer
2017 – Chief executive officer

See also 
Forbes lists

References

External links 
Profile at Forbes.com
Interview for Transcendent Media Capital
Speech for Forbes Romania Awards Gala 2016
Davos 2020 - On the power of greater connectivity
Forbes Blockchain: Every Fish has a Story - WEF 2019
Webinar on Getting the Most Out of Measuring Earned Media’s Impact on Business

Forbes people
Living people
American chief executives in the media industry
American publishing chief executives
Colby College alumni
Tulane University alumni
Year of birth missing (living people)